Vidgo is an American streaming television service that offers over 100 channels of English- and Spanish-language sports, news and general entertainment content. In addition to its live television packages, Vidgo offers a cloud-based digital video recorder and thousands of hours of on-demand programming.

Vidgo launched in 2018 as a streaming service focused on professional sports, primarily soccer, to cord cutters. Over time, the service expanded to include agreements with major television content providers, including A+E Networks, the Walt Disney Company, Fox Corporation, Paramount Global and the Discovery side of the Warner Bros. Discovery portfolio of channels. Their number of subscribers was estimated to be between 25,000 and 100,000 as of 2021.

In 2022, the company hired a new executive leadership team and revamped its mission to provide entertainment, news and sports of interest to the heartland of the United States. It also relaunched its streaming app with a new color palette, logo and other interface improvements.

Programming partners 
Vidgo has a number of programming partners that offer live channels and on-demand content through the service, including:

Supported devices 
Vidgo is available on most popular smart television devices, including:

 Amazon Fire TV
 Android TV / Google TV
 Android devices (Android phones, Android tablets)
 Apple TV
 Apple iOS devices (iPhone, iPad)
 Roku

Channels and on-demand content are also available to stream through most popular web browsers, including Microsoft Edge, Google Chrome and Mozilla Firefox, via the Vidgo website.

Accolades 
Vidgo was named one of the best streaming services in 2022 by People Magazine. Specifically, Vidgo earned high marks for value.

References

External links 

 Official website

 Internet television streaming services